Paramonochamia is a genus of moths belonging to the family Tortricidae.

Species
Paramonochamia moemae Razowski & Becker, 2000

See also
List of Tortricidae genera

References

 , 2005: World catalogue of insects volume 5 Tortricidae.
  2000: Polskie Pismo Ent. 69: 342.

External links
tortricidae.com

Euliini
Tortricidae genera